Disney Princess: Enchanted Journey is a video game based on the Disney Princess franchise, which was released for the PlayStation 2, Wii and Windows in 2007. It was released on PlayStation Network on February 15, 2012 in Europe.

Gameplay
The players can interact with various characters and solve problems by way of a magic wand that they are given at the start of the game. The players can collect gems and transform Bogs into non-threatening butterflies. As players complete each world a gem will shine in their avatar's necklace and their castle will become less run down and more fixed up.

Plot 
The game follows an amnesiac young girl (Isabelle Fuhrman) that is brought to a dilapidated castle called "Gentlehaven" and set on a quest to travel to the homes of various Disney Princesses and help solve problems caused by mischievous creatures called Bogs. The player travels to several worlds inhabited by Ariel (Jodi Benson), Jasmine (Linda Larkin), Cinderella (Jennifer Hale), and Snow White (Carolyn Gardner) ultimately culminating with a battle between the player and Zara - an ex-princess who is trying to stop every girl from becoming a princess. After successfully defeating Zara the player is informed that she is a princess and that she can now travel to the world of Belle (Paige O'Hara) to solve additional problems.

Reception
Common Sense Media and the Gainesville Sun both praised the game overall, and the Gainesville Sun commented that "while "Enchanted Journey" is only for a limited audience, young girls who follow the Disney Princess line will be thrilled with the game and really enjoy exploring the different Princess worlds. The game is easy to learn and fun to play". IGN panned the game for its rough graphics and repetitive nature, remarking that while the game would be "a good way to keep kids entertained for a couple of hours", it was not worth paying full price.

References

External links
 
 Disney Princess: Enchanted Journey on Steam
 Disney Princess: Enchanted Journey at MobyGames

2007 video games
Action-adventure games
Disney Princess
Disney video games
Multiplayer and single-player video games
PlayStation 2 games
Video games developed in the United States
Video games featuring female protagonists
Video games set in castles
Wii games
Windows games
Video games using Havok
Papaya Studio games